"Boots" is a poem by English author and poet Rudyard Kipling (1865–1936). It was first published in 1903, in his collection The Five Nations.

"Boots" imagines the repetitive thoughts of a British Army infantryman marching by forced marches in South Africa during the Second Boer War (which had ended in 1902). It has been said that if the first four words in each line are read at the rate of two words to the second, that gives the time to which the British foot soldier was accustomed to march.

The poem was set to music for low male voice and orchestra by "P. J. McCall", and recorded in 1929 by Australian bass-baritone Peter Dawson. McCall was Dawson, publishing under a pseudonym. That setting was soon recorded by other singers, but seems largely to have fallen out of fashion; perhaps because of World War 2.

American-born British poet T. S. Eliot included the poem in his 1941 anthology A Choice of Kipling's Verse.

The 1915 spoken-word recording of Taylor Holmes reciting the poem has been used for its psychological effect in U.S. military SERE schools.

Poem 
We're foot—slog—slog—slog—sloggin' over Africa—Foot—foot—foot—foot—sloggin' over Africa --

(Boots—boots—boots—boots—movin' up and down again!)

There's no discharge in the war!

Seven—six—eleven—five—nine-an'-twenty mile to-day—Four—eleven—seventeen—thirty-two the day before --

(Boots—boots—boots—boots—movin' up and down again!)

There's no discharge in the war!

Don't--don't--don't--don't--look at what's in front of you.

(Boots—boots—boots—boots—movin' up an' down again);

Men—men—men—men—men go mad with watchin' em,

An' there's no discharge in the war!

Count—count—count—count—the bullets in the bandoliers.

If—your—eyes—drop—they will get atop o' you!

(Boots—boots—boots—boots—movin' up and down again) --

There's no discharge in the war!

We—can—stick—out--'unger, thirst, an' weariness,

But—not—not—not—not the chronic sight of 'em—Boot—boots—boots—boots—movin' up an' down again,

An' there's no discharge in the war!

'Taint—so—bad—by—day because o' company,

But night—brings—long—strings—o' forty thousand million

Boots—boots—boots—boots—movin' up an' down again.

There's no discharge in the war!

I--'ave—marched—six—weeks in 'Ell an' certify

It—is—not—fire—devils, dark, or anything,

But boots—boots—boots—boots—movin' up an' down again,

An' there's no discharge in the war!

Try—try—try—try—to think o' something different—Oh—my—God—keep—me from goin' lunatic!

(Boots—boots—boots—boots—movin' up an' down again!)

There's no discharge in the war!

Recordings

 1915Taylor Holmes (spoken word) Victor B 55057 
 1929Peter Dawson HMV B 3072 
 n.d.Leonard Warren
 n.d.Joseph Farrington Piccadilly 5035
 n.d.Raymond Newell HMV 109
 1935Eric Woodburn 
 1940Norman Corwin (spoken recitation) Columbia 36055 
 1966Owen Brannigan, from The Road to Mandalay: Kipling in Song, HMV 3581
 1978Benjamin Luxon and David Willison (voice and piano) 
 1985  Leslie Fish
 2016 Jocko Willink (spoken word)

References

External links
 

1903 poems
Poetry by Rudyard Kipling
Works about the Second Boer War